Turmus Ayya is a Palestinian town located in the Ramallah and al-Bireh Governorate in the West Bank.  According to the Palestinian Central Bureau of Statistics (PCBS), it had a population of 3,736 in 2007.

Geography

Its surrounding villages are Sinjil and Khirbet Abu Falah as well as the Israeli settlement of Shilo. Turmus Ayya is 720 m above sea level. It is also the northernmost town in the Ramallah District. Turmus Ayya's climate is similar to that of the central West Bank, which is rainy in the winter, and hot and humid in the summer.

History
 
Potsherds from the late Iron Age (8 -7th century B.C.E.) period and later have been found, and it is estimated that the village has existed continuously since then.

Turmus Ayya is generally accepted as being the Turbasaim in Crusader sources. A little northeast of Turmus Ayya is Khirbet Ras ad-Deir/Deir el-Fikia, believed to be the Crusader village of Dere. In 1145, half of the income from both villages were given to the Abbey of Mount Tabor, so that they could maintain the church at Sinjil. In 1175, all three villages; Turmus Ayya, Dere and Sinjil, were transferred to the Church of the Holy Sepulchre.

Ottoman era
In 1517, Turmus Ayya was incorporated into the Ottoman Empire with the rest of Palestine, and in 1596 it appeared in the tax registers as being in the Nahiya of Quds of the Liwa of Quds. It had a population of 43 households, all Muslim, and paid taxes on wheat, barley, olive trees, vineyards, fruit trees, goats and/or beehives; a total of 7,200 akçe. 11/24 of the revenue went to a Waqf.

In 1838, Edward Robinson noted that Turmus Aya was within the province of Jerusalem, but the province of Nablus was just north of it. It was further noted that it was situated "on a low rocky mound in the level valley."

French explorer Victor Guérin visited the village in 1870 and found ancient cisterns, cut stones built up in the houses, a broken lintel with a garland carved upon, and the fragments of a column. He further noted that the village had about seven hundred inhabitants, and was administered by two sheikhs and divided into two different areas. Some ancient cisterns were almost completely dry, and women were forced to fetch water either from Ain Siloun, or Ain Sindjel. An official Ottoman village list from about 1870 showed that "Turmus Aja" had a total of 88 houses and a population of 301, though the population count included men only.

In 1882, the PEF's Survey of Western Palestine Turmus Aya was described as "a village on a low knoll, in a fertile plain, with a spring to the south. The village is of moderate size, and surrounded by fruit trees. On the south at the foot of the mound is the conspicuous white dome of the sacred place." In 1896 the population of Turmus Ayya was estimated to be about 834 persons.

British Mandate era
In the 1922 census of Palestine, conducted by the British Mandate authorities, Turmus Ayya had a population of 707, all Muslim, while in the 1931 census, the village had 185 occupied houses and a population of 717, all Muslims except one Christian woman.

In the 1945 statistics the population was 960, all Muslim, while the total land area was 17,611 dunams, according to an official land and population survey. Of this, 3,665 dunams were allocated for plantations and irrigable land, 7,357 for cereals, while 54 dunams were classified as built-up (urban) areas.

Jordanian era
In the wake of the 1948 Arab–Israeli War, and after the 1949 Armistice Agreements, Turmus Ayya came under Jordanian rule. It was annexed by Jordan in 1950.

The Jordanian census of 1961 found 1,620 inhabitants.

1967-present
Since the Six-Day War in 1967, Turmus Ayya has been under Israeli occupation. 
According to an Israeli census in 1967, there were 1,562 people. By 1989, the population rose to 5,140. 

Under the Oslo Accords of 1995, 64.7% of village land was classified as Area B, and the remaining 35.3% as Area C. Israel has confiscated 752 dunams of village land for the Israeli settlement of Shilo, and another 372 dunams for Mizpe Rahel.

In December 2014, the town was the site of the controversial death of Palestinian official Ziad Abu Ein, during a protest against Israeli occupation.

References

Bibliography

 

 
  
  
 

 

 (p. 279; but see Abel 1938:257; Elitzur 1985b.) 

 

  
 
 (Saulcy, 1854, vol 1, p. 104)

External links
 Welcome To Turmus 'Ayya
Turmus ‘Ayya, Welcome to Palestine
Survey of Western Palestine, Map 14:  IAA, Wikimedia commons 
Turmusayya Town (Fact Sheet), Applied Research Institute–Jerusalem (ARIJ)
Turmus’ayya Town Profile, ARIJ
Turmus’ayya  Aerial photo, ARIJ
Locality Development Priorities and Needs in Turmus’ayya Town, ARIJ
or Palestinian Americans, home brings little freedom March 31, 2013, The National
 http://www.turmusaya.com
In West Bank, Peace Symbol Now Signifies Struggle, Isabel Kershner, October 12, 2010, The New York Times
Land confiscation in Turmus 'Aya village , POICA,  23, December, 2003, 

Towns in the West Bank
Ramallah and al-Bireh Governorate
Municipalities of the State of Palestine